William Leslie Welton (1874-1934) was an American architect.  Some of his works are listed in the U.S. National Register of Historic Places.

Works 
Notable works include:
City National Bank, 2301 University Blvd., Tuscaloosa, AL (Welton, William Leslie) 1922 NRHP-listed 
Empire Building, 1928 1st Ave., N., Birmingham, AL (Welton, William Leslie) NRHP-listed
First Christian Church Education Building, 2100 7th Ave. N., Birmingham, AL (Welton, William Leslie) NRHP-listed
First National-John A. Hand Building, 17 N. 20th St., Birmingham, AL (Welton, William Leslie) NRHP-listed
Orlando Apartments, 2301 Fifteenth Ave. S., Birmingham, AL (Welton, William Leslie) NRHP-listed
Quinlan Castle, 2030 9th Ave., S., Birmingham, AL (Welton, William Leslie) NRHP-listed
Walker County Hospital, 1100 7th Ave., Jasper, AL (Welton, William Leslie) NRHP-listed
Edward Fenns Whitman House, 200 Thomas Ave., Boaz, AL (Welton, William Leslie) NRHP-listed
One house in the Pinehurst Historic District, in Tuscaloosa, Alabama, NRHP-listed
One or more works in the  Chestnut Hill Historic District, roughly bounded by Highland Ave. and Thirty-first St., Birmingham, AL (Welton, William Leslie, NRHP-listed

References

20th-century American architects
 Artists from Birmingham, Alabama
 1874 births
 1934 deaths